In Welsh folklore the Gwragedd Annwn (singular ) are beautiful female fairies who live beneath lakes and rivers and are counted among the Tylwyth Teg or Welsh fairy folk. They are also known as Lake Maidens or Wives of the Lower World.

Folklore
Legends state that the Gwragedd Annwn who lived in Llyn Barfog, or Crumlyn Lake, were ordinary humans cursed by St Patrick for taunting him during a visit. They are also said to be the originators of Welsh Black cattle, who are descendants of the legendary cow Fuwch Gyfeiliorn, who came from the land of the Gwragedd Annwn.

References

Bibliography

 
 
 

Fairies
Welsh folklore
Black Mountain (hill)
Female legendary creatures